Caroline Townsend was an American designer and embroiderer, best known for her design work at Tiffany & Co. and as the principal designer at Associated Artists.

Early life
Caroline Townsend was born in Albany, NY. In 1880, she left home to teach watercolor and china painting at the Hartford, Connecticut branch of the Society of Decorative Art. She taught in Hartford for a year before moving on to New York City.

Career
In May 1881, Townsend's portière won the $500 first place prize at an embroidery competition held by the Society of Decorative Art at the American Art Gallery at Madison Square.
 
Through the exhibition of her textiles at the Society, Townsend would have met Candace Wheeler and begin working with her at Associated Artists, which, in turn, led to her collaborating with Louis C. Tiffany & Company.

Townsend would eventually go on to lead a small collective of women in Farmington, Connecticut and teach them needlepoint. This collective submitted a portière to the Pedestal Fund Art Loan Exhibition. After eventually leaving Associated Artists, Townsend would study painting at the Académie Julian in Paris and the Art Students League of New York.

Townsend died abruptly in 1889, one year after marrying Winthrop Scudder.

Style
Townsend often embroidered flowers which exhibited a surprising deepness for needlework. Her floral designs suggest an influence from the William Morris and the Royal School of Art Needlework. Her technique of using various stitches and colors to create the illusion of depth suggests an influence from Wheeler.

Reception
Townsend has won great praise from critics and her contemporaries alike.

In describing her top prize winning portière at 1881 Society of Decorative Art competition, Harper's Bazaar wrote: 

Louis C. Tiffany wrote that Townsend unscrupulously used every stitch possible to replicate painterly effects of color and shading in needlework.

Candace Wheeler described Townsend as one of the best embroiderers she has known.

Work

Awards and nominations
First Prize, design for portière, Society of Decorative Art, May 1881.

References

Artists from Albany, New York
1854 births
1889 deaths
19th-century American women artists
American embroiderers
Tiffany & Co.
American designers
Artists from New York (state)